The Colonial Ammunition Company (CAC) was an ammunition manufacturer in Auckland, New Zealand. Its predecessor, Whitney & Sons, was established by John Whitney with government encouragement in 1885 during the Russian Scare. Whitney later recruited investors to expand his factory in 1888. The other shareholders were Messrs Greenwood and Batley, of Leeds (owners of the Greenwood & Batley cartridge company); T. Hall, Esq., of Mount Morgan; J. D' Arcey, Esq.; Captain de Lusada, R.N.; J. Clarke, Esq.; and T.Y. Cartwright of Notts. They formed the Colonial Ammunition Company, the first ordnance manufacturer in Australasia.

Components were made in New Zealand and Australia, shipped to England, and then assembled at the Greenwood & Batley plant in Leeds. The finished cartridges were then shipped back to Australia and New Zealand for sale. It later expanded in other business directions from 1925 on.

In the Second World War, it was New Zealand's only industrial manufacturer of ammunition (having temporarily increased its workforce from 230 to 900), with production in countries like Australia having long since overtaken the small size of the New Zealand market for ammunition.

Facilities 

The company operated extensive facilities in Mount Eden, a central suburb of Auckland (originally on the outskirts of the city). The area is now mostly taken up by commercial redevelopment. The only remaining original facility is the compact but massive bluestone building now used as a bar / restaurant.

The company built a rare steel-frame shot tower in 1914 for the creation of lead pellets. Used in the shotgun shells of New Zealand hunters, they had previously been imported, mainly from the United Kingdom. The tower was erected by local blacksmiths W. Wilson and Company, and initially operated by Mr. Lylie with his two daughters (who had previously been supplying CAC with limited quantities of shot from Nelson). The 30-metre drop allowed the tower to produce a maximum of 1,000 tons of shot per year. The tower remained in profitable operation until after World War II when it allowed the company to keep production levels high after military ammunition requirements dropped off again. The tower was the only 20th-century shot tower in Australasia and was the only remaining shot tower in New Zealand. The CAC vacated the premises in the early 1980s, however the tower was saved from destruction after popular protests. In 1983, it was classified as a Category I heritage building by Heritage New Zealand. It was demolished in 2023 after concerns it would collapse due to Cyclone Gabrielle.

Following the entry of the Japanese Empire into the Second World War, there was concern that the site at Mount Eden would be too exposed to a coastal attack. In light of this, the production of munitions was transferred to Hamilton. After the equipment was relocated and buildings constructed and manufacturing at a site on Dey Street, production commenced in June 1942. The facility was closed after the end of the war and equipment and production were transferred back to Mount Eden.

Colonial Ammunition Company, Ltd. (Australia) 
This factory was built in 1888 in Australia at Footscray, Victoria, a suburb of Melbourne. It was founded by Captain John Whitney of CAC New Zealand in a joint venture with several of English partners and was a separate entity from the commercial New Zealand company. The Australian government leased the facility from CAC on 1 January 1921 and bought the facility outright in 1927 and renamed it the Small Arms Ammunition Factory No.1. Five other facilities were briefly opened during World War 2: a new factory at Footscray (SAAF No. 2), two more built at Hendon (SAAF No. 3 & No. 4), one built at Rocklea (SAAF No. 5), and one built at Welshpool (SAAF No. 6). The SAAF No. 1 facility was finally closed in 1945 and was replaced by the nearby SAAF No.2 facility. The facility is now more commonly known as Ammunition Factory Footscray (AFF).

References

External links 

 C.A.C. bar & eatery (now occupying a remaining heritage building)
 Photographs of Colonial Ammunition Company held in Auckland Libraries' heritage collections.

Buildings and structures in Auckland
Heritage New Zealand Category 1 historic places in the Auckland Region
Manufacturing companies established in 1885
New Zealand companies established in 1885
Weapons manufacturing companies
1910s architecture in New Zealand
1880s architecture in New Zealand
Defunct manufacturing companies of New Zealand
Shot towers